Bakum is a municipality in the district of Vechta, in Lower Saxony, Germany. It is situated in the Vechta district in western Lower Saxony. Bakum lies on the A1 freeway between Bremen and Osnabrück.

References

External links
Official site 

Vechta (district)